Streamsound Records was an independent American record label specializing in country music artists.  It was launched by Byron Gallimore (producer of Tim McGraw, Sugarland, Faith Hill) and Jim Wilkes in 2012.
Streamsound Records is based in Nashville, Tennessee, and is distributed by Sony Music Nashville. Its first signing was Canadian singer/songwriter Jaida Dreyer  and Austin Webb was signed in late 2012.

Jaida Dreyer's debut album, I Am Jaida Dreyer, was the first album released from the label on February 26, 2013. Streamsound closed in 2015.

Past artists

Dakota Bradley
Kristian Bush
Jaida Dreyer
Austin Webb

See also
 List of record labels

References

External links
Streamsound Records
Jaida Dreyer
Austin Webb
Dakota Bradley

American country music record labels
American independent record labels
Record labels established in 2012